Emma Langford is an Irish singer-songwriter from Caherdavin, a northern suburb of Limerick City. She is best known for singing folk music.

She released her debut album, Quiet Giant, in 2017 – for which she received the Best Emerging Artist award at the inaugural RTE Radio 1 Folk Awards. In 2019 she embarked on an international tour, making her US debut at the Milwaukee Irish Fests.

In 2019, she became the first ever recipient of the Dolores O'Riordan Bursary – an award created in memory of the late singer from Limerick to promote creative arts projects in the city.

Langford released her second album, Sowing Acorns, in 2020. All of the proceeds from the first single from this album, ‘Mariana’ were donated to Safe Ireland, a charity focused on protecting women and children from domestic violence. Langford collaborated with Belfast poet and actor Vanessa Ifediora on her single Sowing Acorns.

She has been nominated for Best Folk Singer at the RTE Radio 1 Folk Awards 2020.

Langford also curates the Limerick Lady Festival, an initiative which aims to promote female musicians to tackle the issue of gender imbalance in the music industry. The Festival has also inspired a podcast called The Limerick Lady Podcast, which Langford presents alongside Ann Blake, where they discuss issues around gender, art and representation.

She holds a BA in voice and dance from the University of Limerick, and has also completed an MA at the same institution.

In October 2021, it was announced that Langford has been included on the longlist for the 64th Annual Grammy Awards in two categories; Album of the Year and Song of the Year.

Awards and nominations

RTÉ Radio 1 Folk Awards

|-
|align="center" | 2017 || Emma Langford || Best Emerging Artist || 
|-
|align="center" | 2020 || Emma Langford || Best Folk Singer || 
|-

Grammy Awards

|-
|align="center" | 2021 || Emma Langford, Sowing Acorns || Album of the Year || 
|-
|align="center" | 2020 || Emma Langford, Birdsong || Song of the Year || 
|-

External links

References

Irish women singer-songwriters
Musicians from Limerick (city)

1989 births
Living people